Kartik Tyagi (born 8 November 2000) is an Indian cricketer. He made his first-class debut for Uttar Pradesh in the 2017–18 Ranji Trophy on 6 October 2017, a month before he turned 17.

Career 
He made his List A debut for Uttar Pradesh in the 2017–18 Vijay Hazare Trophy on 5 February 2018. In December 2019, he was named in India's squad for the 2020 Under-19 Cricket World Cup. In the 2020 IPL auction, he was bought by the Rajasthan Royals ahead of the 20 lacs2020 Indian Premier League. He made his Twenty20 debut for the Rajasthan Royals in the 2020 Indian Premier League on 6 October 2020, against the Mumbai Indians.

On 26 October 2020, Tyagi was named as one of four additional bowlers to travel with Indian cricket team for their tour to Australia.

On 21 September 2021, Tyagi conceded just one run in the final over against Punjab Kings while defending four, and was named man of the match. In February 2022, he was bought by the Sunrisers Hyderabad in the auction for the 2022 Indian Premier League tournament.

References

External links
 

2000 births
Living people
Indian cricketers
Rajasthan Royals cricketers
Uttar Pradesh cricketers
Sunrisers Hyderabad cricketers